The Church of St George, Bolton, is a redundant church in Bolton, Greater Manchester, England. It was designated a Grade II* listed building on 26 April 1974. It was completed in 1796 and had a shallow chancel and south chapel added or rebuilt 1907 by James Simpson. It closed in 1975, and is now a crafts centre.

In 1806, a set of change ringing bells was cast by John Rudhall for the church, to celebrate Nelson's Victory at Trafalgar. In 1976 the bells were removed from the closed church and destined for a local scrapyard when they were acquired by the Anglican Diocese of Wangaratta. In 1977 the bells were shipped to Victoria, and they were first rung in their new home in 1987, once a tower had been built to house them. They are now the oldest "complete" ring of bells in Australia.

See also
 List of churches in Greater Manchester
 Grade II* listed buildings in Greater Manchester

References

Churches completed in 1796
18th-century churches in the United Kingdom
Bolton
Buildings and structures in Bolton
1796 establishments in England